Irene Martínez (born 20 February 1966) is a Spanish gymnast. She competed at the 1980 Summer Olympics and the 1984 Summer Olympics.

References

1966 births
Living people
Spanish female artistic gymnasts
Olympic gymnasts of Spain
Gymnasts at the 1980 Summer Olympics
Gymnasts at the 1984 Summer Olympics
Gymnasts from Madrid
20th-century Spanish women